James Grover Thurber (December 8, 1894 – November 2, 1961) was an American cartoonist, writer, humorist, journalist and playwright. He was best known for his cartoons and short stories, published mainly in The New Yorker and collected in his numerous books.

Thurber was one of the most popular humorists of his time and celebrated the comic frustrations and eccentricities of ordinary people. His works have frequently been adapted into films, including The Male Animal (1942), The Battle of the Sexes (1959, based on Thurber's "The Catbird Seat"), and The Secret Life of Walter Mitty (adapted twice, in 1947 and in 2013).

Life
Thurber was born in Columbus, Ohio, to Charles L. Thurber and Mary Agnes "Mame" (née Fisher) Thurber on December 8, 1894. Both of his parents greatly influenced his work. His father was a sporadically employed clerk and minor politician who dreamed of being a lawyer or an actor. Thurber described his mother as a "born comedian" and "one of the finest comic talents I think I have ever known." She was a practical joker and, on one occasion, pretended to be disabled and attended a faith healer revival, only to jump up and proclaim herself healed.

When Thurber was seven years old, he and one of his brothers were playing a game of William Tell, when his brother shot James in the eye with an arrow. He lost that eye, and the injury later caused him to become almost entirely blind. He was unable to participate in sports and other activities in his childhood because of this injury, but he developed a creative mind, which he used to express himself in writings. Neurologist V. S. Ramachandran suggests that Thurber's imagination may be partly explained by Charles Bonnet syndrome, a neurological condition that causes complex visual hallucinations in people who have had some level of visual loss. (This was the basis for the piece "The Admiral on the Wheel".)

From 1913 to 1918, Thurber attended Ohio State University where he was a member of the Phi Kappa Psi fraternity and editor of the student magazine, the Sundial. It was during this time he rented the house on 77 Jefferson Avenue, which became Thurber House in 1984. He never graduated from the university because his poor eyesight prevented him from taking a mandatory Reserve Officers' Training Corps (ROTC) course. In 1995 he was posthumously awarded a degree.

From 1918 to 1920, Thurber worked as a code clerk for the United States Department of State, first in Washington, D.C. and then at the embassy in Paris. On returning to Columbus, he began his career as a reporter for The Columbus Dispatch from 1921 to 1924. During part of this time, he reviewed books, films, and plays in a weekly column called "Credos and Curios", a title that was given to a posthumous collection of his work. Thurber returned to Paris during this period, where he wrote for the Chicago Tribune and other newspapers.

Move to New York
In 1925, Thurber moved to Greenwich Village in New York City, obtaining a job as a reporter with the New York Evening Post. He joined the staff of The New Yorker in 1927 as an editor, with the help of E. B. White, his friend and fellow New Yorker contributor. His career as a cartoonist began in 1930 after White found some of Thurber's drawings in a trash can and submitted them for publication; White inked-in some of these earlier drawings to make them reproduce better for the magazine, and years later expressed deep regret he had done such a thing. Thurber contributed both his writings and his drawings to The New Yorker until the 1950s.

Marriage and family
Thurber married Althea Adams in 1922, although the marriage, as he later wrote to a friend, devolved into “a relationship charming, fine, and hurting.” The marriage ended in divorce in May 1935. They lived in Fairfield County, Connecticut, with their daughter Rosemary (b. 1931). He married Helen Wismer (1902–1986) in June 1935. After meeting Mark Van Doren on a ferry to Martha's Vineyard, Thurber began summering in Cornwall, Connecticut, along with many other prominent artists and authors of the time. After three years of renting Thurber found a home, which he referred to as "The Great Good Place."

Death
Thurber's behavior became erratic and unpredictable in his last year. At a party hosted by Noël Coward, Thurber was taken back to the Algonquin Hotel at six in the morning. Thurber was stricken with a blood clot on the brain on October 4, 1961, and underwent emergency surgery, drifting in and out of consciousness. Although the operation was initially successful, Thurber died a few weeks later, on November 2, aged 66, due to complications from pneumonia. The doctors said his brain was senescent from several small strokes and hardening of the arteries. His last words, aside from the repeated word "God", were "God bless... God damn", according to his wife, Helen.

Legacy and honors
 Established in 1997, the annual Thurber Prize honors outstanding examples of American humor.
 In 2008, the Library of America selected Thurber's story, "A Sort of Genius", first published in The New Yorker, for inclusion in its two-century retrospective of American True Crime.
 Two of his residences have been listed on the U.S. National Register of Historic Places: his childhood Thurber House in Ohio and the Sanford–Curtis–Thurber House in Fairfield County, Connecticut.

Career
Thurber also became well known for his simple, outlandish drawings and cartoons. Both his literary and his drawing skills were helped along by the support of, and collaboration with, fellow New Yorker staff member E. B. White, who insisted that Thurber's sketches could stand on their own as artistic expressions. Thurber drew six covers and numerous classic illustrations for The New Yorker.

Writer

Many of Thurber's short stories are humorous fictional memoirs from his life, but he also wrote darker material, such as "The Whip-Poor-Will", a story of madness and murder. His best-known short stories are "The Dog That Bit People" and "The Night the Bed Fell"; they can be found in My Life and Hard Times, which was his "break-out" book. Among his other classics are "The Secret Life of Walter Mitty", "The Catbird Seat", "The Night the Ghost Got In", "A Couple of Hamburgers", "The Greatest Man in the World", and "If Grant Had Been Drinking at Appomattox". The Middle-Aged Man on the Flying Trapeze has several short stories with a tense undercurrent of marital discord. The book was published the year of his divorce and remarriage.

Although his 1941 story "You Could Look It Up", about a three-foot adult being brought in to take a walk in a baseball game, has been said to have inspired Bill Veeck's stunt with Eddie Gaedel with the St. Louis Browns in 1951, Veeck claimed an older provenance for the stunt.

In addition to his other fiction, Thurber wrote over seventy-five fables, some of which were first published in The New Yorker (1939), then collected in Fables for Our Time and Famous Poems Illustrated (1940) and Further Fables for Our Time (1956). These were short stories that featured anthropomorphic animals (e.g. "The Little Girl and the Wolf", his version of Little Red Riding Hood) as main characters, and ended with a moral as a tagline. An exception to this format was his most famous fable, "The Unicorn in the Garden", which featured an all-human cast except for the unicorn, which doesn't speak. Thurber's fables were satirical, and the morals served as punch lines as well as advice to the reader, demonstrating "the complexity of life by depicting the world as an uncertain, precarious place, where few reliable guidelines exist." His stories also included several book-length fairy tales, such as The White Deer (1945), The 13 Clocks (1950) and The Wonderful O (1957). The latter was one of several of Thurber's works illustrated by Marc Simont. 

Thurber's prose for The New Yorker and other venues included numerous humorous essays. A favorite subject, especially toward the end of his life, was the English language. Pieces on this subject included "The Spreading 'You Know'," which decried the overuse of that pair of words in conversation, "The New Vocabularianism", and "What Do You Mean It Was Brillig?". His short pieces – whether stories, essays or something in between – were referred to as "casuals" by Thurber and the staff of The New Yorker.

Thurber wrote a five-part New Yorker series, between 1947 and 1948, examining in depth the radio soap opera phenomenon, based on near-constant listening and researching over the same period. Leaving nearly no element of these programs unexamined, including their writers, producers, sponsors, performers, and listeners alike, Thurber republished the series in his anthology, The Beast in Me and Other Animals (1948), under the section title "Soapland." The series was one of the first to examine such a pop-culture phenomenon in depth.

The last twenty years of Thurber's life were filled with material and professional success in spite of his blindness. He published at least fourteen books in that era, including The Thurber Carnival (1945), Thurber Country (1953), and the extremely popular book about New Yorker founder/editor Harold Ross, The Years with Ross (1959). A number of his short stories were made into movies, including The Secret Life of Walter Mitty in 1947.

Cartoonist
While Thurber drew his cartoons in the usual fashion in the 1920s and 1930s, his failing eyesight later required changes. He drew them on very large sheets of paper using a thick black crayon (or on black paper using white chalk, from which they were photographed and the colors reversed for publication). Regardless of method, his cartoons became as noted as his writings; they possessed an eerie, wobbly feel that seems to mirror his idiosyncratic view on life. He once wrote that people said it looked like he drew them under water. Dorothy Parker, a contemporary and friend of Thurber, referred to his cartoons as having the "semblance of unbaked cookies". The last drawing Thurber completed was a self-portrait in yellow crayon on black paper, which was featured as the cover of Time magazine on July 9, 1951. The same drawing was used for the dust jacket of The Thurber Album (1952).

Adaptations
Thurber teamed with college schoolmate (and actor/director) Elliott Nugent to write The Male Animal, a comic drama that became a major Broadway hit in 1939. The play was adapted as a film by the same name in 1942, starring Henry Fonda, Olivia de Havilland and Jack Carson.
In 1947 his short story "The Secret Life of Walter Mitty", was loosely adapted as a film by the same name. Danny Kaye played the title character.
In 1951 United Productions of America announced an animated feature to be based on Thurber's work, titled Men, Women and Dogs. The only part of the ambitious project that was eventually released was the UPA cartoon The Unicorn in the Garden (1953).
In 1958, Thurber's short story "One Is a Wanderer" was adapted for General Electric Theatre, resulting in Emmy nominations for writer Samuel Taylor and director Herschel Daugherty.
 The 1959 film The Battle of the Sexes was based on Thurber's 1942 short story "The Catbird Seat".
In 1960, Thurber fulfilled a long-standing desire to be on the professional stage and played himself in 88 performances of the revue A Thurber Carnival (which echoes the title of his 1945 book, The Thurber Carnival). It was based on a selection of Thurber's stories and cartoon captions. Thurber appeared in the sketch "File and Forget". The sketch consists of Thurber dictating a series of letters in a vain attempt to keep one of his publishers from sending him books he did not order, and the escalating confusion of the replies. Thurber received a Special Tony Award for the adapted script of the Carnival.
In 1961, "The Secret Life of James Thurber" aired on The DuPont Show with June Allyson. Adolphe Menjou appeared in the program as Fitch, and Orson Bean and Sue Randall portrayed John and Ellen Monroe.
In 1969–70, a full series based on Thurber's writings and life, titled My World... and Welcome to It, was broadcast on NBC. It starred William Windom as the Thurber figure. Featuring animated portions in addition to live actors, the show won a 1970 Emmy Award as the year's best comedy series. Windom won an Emmy as well. He went on to perform Thurber material in a one-man stage show.
In 1972 another film adaptation, The War Between Men and Women, starring Jack Lemmon, concludes with an animated version of Thurber's classic anti-war work "The Last Flower".
In 2013, a new adaptation of The Secret Life of Walter Mitty, starring Ben Stiller as the title character.

In popular culture
Beginning during his own father's terminal illness, television broadcaster Keith Olbermann read excerpts from Thurber's short stories during the closing segment of his MSNBC program Countdown with Keith Olbermann on Fridays, which he called "Fridays with Thurber." He reintroduced this during the COVID-19 pandemic of 2020, reading Thurber stories daily at 8:00 p.m. EDT on Twitter.
On an episode of Norm Macdonald's video podcast, Norm Macdonald Live, Norm tells a story in which comedian Larry Miller acknowledges that his biggest influence in comedy was Thurber.
In 2021 film The French Dispatch by Wes Anderson, he was mentioned in the end title credits as inspiration.

Bibliography

Books
Is Sex Necessary? Or, Why You Feel the Way You Do, (1929 with E. B. White), 75th anniv. edition (2004) with foreword by John Updike, 
The Owl in the Attic and Other Perplexities, 1931
The Seal in the Bedroom and Other Predicaments, 1932
My Life and Hard Times, 1933 
The Middle-Aged Man on the Flying Trapeze, 1935
Let Your Mind Alone! and Other More Or Less Inspirational Pieces, 1937
The Last Flower, 1939, reissued 2007 
Fables for Our Time and Famous Poems Illustrated, 1940 
My World—And Welcome to It, 1942 
Men, Women and Dogs, 1943
The Thurber Carnival (anthology), 1945,  (Modern Library Edition)
The Beast in Me and Other Animals, 1948 
The Thurber Album, 1952
Thurber Country, 1953
Thurber's Dogs, 1955
Further Fables for Our Time, 1956
Alarms and Diversions (anthology), 1957
The Years with Ross, 1959 
Lanterns and Lances, 1961

Children's books
Many Moons, 1943
The Great Quillow, 1944
The White Deer, 1945
The 13 Clocks, 1950
The Wonderful O, 1957

Plays
The Male Animal, 1940 (with Elliott Nugent)
A Thurber Carnival, 1960

Posthumous books
Credos and Curios, 1962 (ed. Helen W. Thurber)
Thurber & Company, 1966 (ed. Helen W. Thurber)
Selected Letters of James Thurber, 1981 (ed. Helen W. Thurber & Edward Weeks) 
Collecting Himself: James Thurber on Writing and Writers, Humor and Himself, 1989 (ed. Michael J. Rosen)
Thurber on Crime, 1991 (ed. Robert Lopresti) 
People Have More Fun Than Anybody: A Centennial Celebration of Drawings and Writings by James Thurber, 1994 (ed. Michael J. Rosen) 
James Thurber: Writings and Drawings (anthology), 1996, (ed. Garrison Keillor), Library of America, 
The Dog Department: James Thurber on Hounds, Scotties, and Talking Poodles, 2001 (ed. Michael J. Rosen) 
The Thurber Letters: The Wit, Wisdom, and Surprising Life of James Thurber, 2002 (ed. Harrison Kinney, with Rosemary A. Thurber) 
Collected Fables, 2019 (ed. Michael J. Rosen), ISBN
A Mile and a Half of Lines: The Art of James Thurber, 2019 (ed. Michael J. Rosen)

Short stories

 “A Box to Hide In”
 "A Ride with Olympy"
 "The Departure of Emma Inch"
 "The Admiral on the Wheel"
 "Doc Marlowe"
 "One is a Wanderer"
 "The Topaz Cuff Links Mystery"
 "What Do You Mean It Was Brillig?"
 "The Glass in the Field"
 "The Crow and the Oriole"
 "The Little Girl and the Wolf"
 "Snapshot of a Dog"
 "Oh When I Was..."
 "The Greatest Man in the World"
 "If Grant had been Drinking at Appomattox"
 "The Bear Who Let it Alone"
 "Destructive Forces Life"
 "The Seal Who Became Famous"
 "The Moth and the Star"
 "Sex Ex Machina"
 "The Man Who Hated Moonbaum"
 "The Black Magic of Barney Haller"
 "The Secret Life of Walter Mitty"
 "The Night the Bed Fell"
 "The Night the Ghost Got In"
 "The Unicorn in the Garden"
 "The Moth and the Star"
 "The Rabbits Who Caused All the Trouble"
 "The Macbeth Murder Mystery", 1937 (printed in The New Yorker)
 "The Sheep in Wolf's Clothing", The New Yorker (April 29, 1939)
 "You Could Look It Up", 1941
 "The Catbird Seat", 1942
 "The Secret Life of James Thurber", 1943
 "The Breaking Up of the Winships", 1945
 "A Couple of Hamburgers"
 "The Greatest Man in the World"
 "The Cane in the Corridor"
 "The Bear Who Let It Alone"
 "The Princess and the Tin Box"
 "The Dog That Bit People"
 "The Lady on 142"
 "The Remarkable Case of Mr.Bruhl"
 "The Scotty Who Knew Too Much"
 "The Night the Ghost Got In"
 "The Car We Had to Push"
 "The Day the Dam Broke"
 "More Alarms at Night"
 "A Sequence of Servants"
 "University Days"
 "Draft Board Nights"
 "The Curb in the Sky"
 "The Wood Duck"
 "The Tiger Who Was to Be King"
 "The Owl Who Was God"
"The Peacelike Mongoose"
 "File and Forget"
 "The Whip-Poor-Will"
 "Mr. Preble Gets Rid of His Wife"
 "The Evening's at Seven"

See also
 The Battle of the Sexes (1959 film) based on "The Catbird Seat"
 Walter Mitty, expression

References

Further reading

Biographies of Thurber
 Bernstein, Burton. 1975. Thurber. William Morrow & Co. 
 Fensch, Thomas. 2001. The Man Who Was Walter Mitty: The Life and Work of James Thurber.  
 Grauer, Neil A. 1994. Remember Laughter: A Life of James Thurber. University of Nebraska Press. 
 Kinney, Harrison. 1995. James Thurber: His Life and Times. Henry Holt & Co.

Literature review
 Holmes, Charles S. 1972. The Clocks Of Columbus: The Literary Career of James Thurber Atheneum.

External links

Official Website of James Thurber – overseen by the Thurber estate and editor Michael J. Rosen
The James Thurber Papers – The Ohio State University Libraries Rare Books and Manuscripts Collection
 
 Charles S. Holmes Research for The Clocks of Columbus – The Ohio State University Libraries Rare Books and Manuscripts Collection
 The Harrison Kinney Archive for James Thurber: His Life and Times – The Ohio State University Libraries Rare Books and Manuscripts Collection
 The Paris Review Interview
 The Thurber House website
 JAMES THURBER'S WORLD AND WELCOME TO IT) by Bill Ervolino, The Record (Bergen County, NJ), December 17, 1995
 Pathfinder: James Grover Thurber – Thurber links portal
 The Last Flower – ballet after an idea by James Thurber; 1975
 Origins of "the Thurber Dog"
 James Thurber Biography, Encyclopedia of World Biography
 New Yorker magazine digital archive – abstracts of 1,758 Thurber short stories, poems, cartoons and commentaries
 a list of James Thurber books 
 an alphabetical list of James Thurber short stories
  – 1982 dramatization of the James Thurber short story
 Designing Your Grandfather’s Book (When He’s James Thurber)

1894 births
1961 deaths
20th-century American novelists
American cartoonists
American humorists
American male novelists
American male short story writers
American male dramatists and playwrights
American blind people
Blind writers
Burials at Green Lawn Cemetery (Columbus, Ohio)
Fabulists
Deaths from pneumonia in New York City
Ohio State University alumni
Artists from Columbus, Ohio
Special Tony Award recipients
The New Yorker cartoonists
The New Yorker editors
The New Yorker people
Writers from Columbus, Ohio
Writers who illustrated their own writing
20th-century American short story writers
20th-century American male writers
Novelists from Ohio
20th-century American essayists
American male essayists
American expatriates in France